Orfeas, named after the mythical musician Orpheus, is a former municipality in the Evros regional unit, East Macedonia and Thrace, Greece. Since the 2011 local government reform it is part of the municipality Soufli, of which it is a municipal unit. Its land area is 643.266 km² (248.366 sq mi) and its population was 4,761 inhabitants at the 2011 census. It is located in the north-central part of Evros, and borders both southeastern Bulgaria and northwestern Turkey. The seat of the municipality was in Lavara (pop. 1,093 in 2011). Much of the land is mountainous and forested to the west, extending up to the Rhodope regional unit.  It is linked with GR-51 (Alexandroupoli – Orestiada – Edirne in Turkey and Svilengrad in Bulgaria). The town of Lávara sits on a plain. It is located SE of Svilengrad, S of Edirne, Turkey and Orestiada, and 13 km N of Soufli and 78 km N of Alexandroupoli.
The municipality's next largest towns are Agriani, Mega Dereio and Amorio.

History
The municipality was affected by flooding of the Evros river in February and March 2005. 50 houses were damaged. The rail south of Lavara and near the station were also flooded and was closed that time.

Geography
Forests dominate the river banks and parts of the plain. Much of the area are used for farming. The main production are cattle, fruits and vegetables and some flowers. The mountains dominate further west.

Subdivisions
The municipal unit Orfeas is subdivided into the following communities (constituent villages in brackets):
Lavara
Amorio
Kyriaki
Mandra
Mavrokklisi (Mavrokklisi, Korymvos)
Mikro Dereio (Mikro Dereio, Geriko, Goniko, Mega Dereio, Petrolofos, Roussa, Sidirochori)
Protokklisi (Protokklisi, Agriani)

Historical population

References

External links
http://thesaurus.duth.gr/english/moredata.asp?Perioxh_ID=42&Subj=255
Evros floods
Critical hours in Lavara during the floods – pathfinder.gr
https://web.archive.org/web/20060219001458/http://orfeas.evros.gr/lavara.htm (in Greek)

 
Populated places in Evros (regional unit)

bg:Орфей (дем)
el:Δήμος Σουφλίου#Ενότητα Ορφέα